Fshat i Ri  may refer to:
 Fshat i Ri, Shkodër
 Fshat i Ri, Gjirokastër